Melissa Anne Reynard (born 14 March 1972) is a former English cricketer and member of the England women's cricket team. In a career spanning 1990 to 2006, she played 6 Test matches and 54 Women's One Day Internationals.  She is a left-arm medium pace bowler and right-handed batsman.

References

External links
 

Living people
England women Test cricketers
England women One Day International cricketers
1972 births
Yorkshire women cricketers
Cricketers from Yorkshire